David Knox is an Australian former rugby union footballer and coach.

Life and career
Knox was capped 13 times for Australia and was a member of the 1991 Australian World Cup champion squad. Prior to winning eight First Grade Premiership with Randwick, he lost a Second Grade Premiership to the very strong Eastwood Rugby Club team in 1983.

Knox was regularly the appointed goal kicker in teams he joined, known as "the man for the job."

He also played with Petrarca Padova Rugby (1986–1989) where he won the 1987 National Championship, Rugby Livorno (1990–1992), Bristol Rugby (1998) and Racing Métro 92, Narbonne (1999).

From 1996 he played for the ACT Brumbies, where he subsequently held the position of assistant backs coach, in the Super 12 (now Super Rugby) from 1996 to 1998 including the 1997 Super 12 season against the Auckland Blues.

He scored 130 points for the Wallabies, approximately 600 points at provincial level (New South Wales, ACT Brumbies and ) and a club record 2,900 points with Randwick.

Coaching
Knox has held coaching positions with Padova (2000), Waverley College (2002–2003), South Sydney Rugby League (2003) and Randwick (with Michael Cheika). In 2005, he joined Michael Chelka to Leinster as backs coach. While there Leinster made the semi-finals and quarter-finals of the Heineken Cup, and won the Celtic League title.

He left Leinster in 2008 to return to Australia, but in a post-departure interview was controversially critical of Irish provincial team Munster and the appointment of incoming Irish coach Declan Kidney.

From 2013 to 2015 while as a teacher at Sydney Boys High School, also coached the 1st XV while helping with all junior grades' development. Knox has been teaching at Sydney Boys High School and is a design technology teacher. Knox had been studying design and technology to ensure he can become a permanent teacher and to also ensure his students are well taught.

He has also done annual consultant rugby coaching in the United States from 2011 to 2016, with stints at Columbia University in New York City, SFGG in San Francisco and most recently at Morris Rugby & Drew University in New Jersey.

References

 Leinster Rugby homepage

External links
 

Living people
Australian rugby union players
Australian rugby union coaches
Australia international rugby union players
1963 births
Rugby union players from Sydney
Rugby union fly-halves